is a 1946 Japanese film directed by Akira Kurosawa, Hideo Sekigawa and Kajiro Yamamoto (who was also co-writer). It was produced to illustrate the purpose of the workers' union at the Toho film studios, as the Allied Forces endorsed the formation of unions as part of the democratisation process during the post-World War II Occupation of Japan. Kurosawa later denounced the film, calling it "a committee-made film" in which he had been involved only one week, and refused to mention it in his autobiography. Toho's studio stars Hideko Takamine and Susumu Fujita appear playing themselves.

Plot
The sisters Chieko, a script girl working at a big film studio, and Aiko, a revue dancer, are daughters to anti-unionist father Gintaro. When the workers at a railway company, including the family's subtenant Seizo, go on strike, Chieko and her co-workers demonstrate their solidarity and call for strike as well to achieve financial security for the film studio's staff. Meanwhile, Aiko and her dancing troupe decide to get organised in opposition to the theatre's mean stage manager. When Gintaro is fired together with a large group of employees at his company, he finally gives up his reluctance and joins the unionists, impressed by their earnestness.

Cast 
 Susumu Fujita - Fujita
 Hideko Takamine - Takamine
 Kenji Susukida - Gintaro Okamoto, Father
 Masayuki Mori - Seizo Hori, Chauffeur
 Chieko Takehisa - Kin Okamoto, Mother
 Takashi Shimura - Theatre manager
 Yonosuke Toba - Okamoto's colleague
 Masao Shimizu - Section chief
 Hyo Kitazawa - Director
 Chieko Nakakita

References

External links
 
 
 

1946 films
1946 drama films
Japanese drama films
Japanese black-and-white films
Films directed by Akira Kurosawa
Films produced by Sōjirō Motoki
Toho films
Films directed by Kajiro Yamamoto